ISAM or Isam may refer to:

Computing
ISAM, the IBM mainframe indexed sequential access method
C-ISAM, a C language application programming interface
MyISAM, a storage engine for MySQL

People
Isam Bachiri, a Danish rapper
Banu Isam, a former Berber Muslim dynasty
Isam al Khafaji, an Iraqi political economist
Isam al-Qadi, a Palestinian Ba'thist politician
Isam al-Attar, a former Muslim Brotherhood leader

Organizations
Institute for Sales and Account Management
International Society of Addiction Medicine
Hitchcock Institute for the Study of American Music at Brooklyn College
International Society for Aerosols in Medicine

Others
ISAM (album), an album by musician Amon Tobin
The Iraqi Security Assistance mission, part of the Multi-National Security Transition Command – Iraq